Anicet Turinay (born 18 April 1945) is a conservative politician from Martinique who served in the French National Assembly from 1993 to 2002.

References 

Anicet Turinay page on the French National Assembly website

1945 births
Living people
People from Gros-Morne, Martinique
Martiniquais politicians
Rally for the Republic politicians
Deputies of the 10th National Assembly of the French Fifth Republic
Deputies of the 11th National Assembly of the French Fifth Republic
Black French politicians